The athletics competition at the 2015 European Youth Summer Olympic Festival was held at the Athletics Stadium of Tbilisi in Tbilisi, Georgia between 27 July and 1 August. A total of 36 events were held, evenly divided between the sexes, repeating the programme of the previous edition.

The competition was preceded the World Athletics Leaders Seminar, which included European Athletics president Svein Arne Hansen and IAAF Vice President Sergey Bubka among its attendees. The games' athletics came ahead of the city's hosting of the 2016 European Athletics Youth Championships – the first edition of the competition, which will be held in the even years between the European Youth Festival's events.

French jumper Enzo Hodebar was the most successful athlete in the sport, being the only youth to take two individual titles with his long jump and triple jump wins. Serbia had two double medallists in the 1500 metres and 3000 metres: Elzan Bibić won a gold and a silver in the boys' events while Tamara Mićević was a double runner-up on the girl's side.

France easily topped the medal table with six gold medals among its haul of twelve – its performance in athletics accounted for most of the medals at the games, in which it placed third in the overall medal table. Russian had the next highest number of golds, at four, while the Netherlands had the second highest total with six medals including three gold. Ukraine ranked third with three golds and two silver medals. In total athletes from thirty nations reached the podium at the competition. The host nation failed to appear on the medal table.

Medal summary

Boys

Girls

Medal table

References

Results
Athletics Results. Tbilisi2015. Retrieved on 2015-08-06.
Results

2015 European Youth Summer Olympic Festival
European Youth Summer Olympic Festival
2015
Athletics in Georgia (country)